Ron Wilson (10 September 1924 - 31 January 2007) was an English footballer who played as a wing half for West Ham United.

Footballing career
Born in Sale, Cheshire, England, Wilson started playing for West Ham in 1944 in the wartime competition for League south of the Wartime League. Primarily a wing half, Wilson could play in any defensive position. He played only 39 times in his West Ham career in all competitions but only three in the Football League after the war had finished. His only 2 goals came on 24 March 1945 in a 3–1 win against Millwall. His final game was on 6 December 1947 in a 2–1 away defeat to Leeds United. After this Wilson retired from playing and coached for Hornchurch, Upminster, Aveley and Barking.

References

1924 births
2007 deaths
English footballers
Association football wing halves
West Ham United F.C. players
English Football League players
People from Sale, Greater Manchester